Chloroclystis olivata is a moth in the family Geometridae. It was described by Warren in 1901. It is found in southern India and Sri Lanka.

References

External links

Moths described in 1901
olivata